Wolf Island is an island in the Galápagos Islands.

Wolf Island may also refer to:

Lakes

Canada
 Wolf Island (Lower Buckhorn Lake), a lake in Lower Buckhorn Lake, Peterborough County, Ontario
 Wolfe Island (Ontario)
 the largest of the South Wolf Island, Labrador

United States
 an early name for the Kudobin Islands, Alaska
 an island in Wolf Island National Wildlife Refuge, McIntosh County, Georgia
 a Montana island in the Missouri River
 an island in Newfound Lake, Grafton County, New Hampshire
 Wolf Island (Tennessee), an island on the Tennessee River

Other
 Wolf Island, Missouri, an unincorporated community
 Wolf Island (novel), a novel by author Darren Shan

See also
 Wolfe Island (disambiguation)